The Legislative Assembly of Paraná is the unicameral legislature of Paraná state in Brazil. It has 54 state deputies elected by proportional representation.

The Assembly began on December 19, 1853 when Paraná became a province (before it was a territory of São Paulo).

External links
 

Paraná (state)
Parana
Parana